Ficus lateriflora is a species of fig tree in the family Moraceae.

It is endemic to Mauritius and Réunion, islands off the coast of East Africa in the Indian Ocean .

References

lateriflora
Endemic flora of Mauritius
Endemic flora of Réunion
Trees of Africa
Taxa named by Martin Vahl
Critically endangered flora of Africa
Taxonomy articles created by Polbot